Munich attack may refer to:

 2016 Munich shooting
 2016 Munich knife attack
 1980 Oktoberfest terror attack
 1972 Munich massacre